Chehel Dokhtaran minaret is a historical minaret in Isfahan, Iran. It is located in the Jouybareh district of Isfahan. According to the kufic inscription on the minaret, it is built in 1112. It is the fifth oldest minaret in Iran, which has an inscription. There's a big window on the minaret, which faces the qibla. This feature does not exist in other minarets of Isfahan. There is a spiral staircase in the minaret, which leads to the top of it. This minaret is 40 meters high. Originally, the minaret was higher, but in the course of time its height has been decreased. The minaret towers over the city quarter and can be seen from the far distance, but it is difficult to reach it through the mazes of winding alleys and narrow streets.

Etymology
Chehel Dokhtaran in Persian means ' forty girls'. The origin of its meaning is unknown. The number 'forty' in the Iranian culture is used for exaggerating. Perhaps there was once a building beside it, which pertained exclusively to women and does not exist any more. The people of the Neighborhood call this minaret also Garland minaret. Garland was a British religious missionary, who came to Iran in the early 20th century and worked near the minaret.

References 

Buildings and structures completed in 1112
12th-century mosques
Towers completed in the 12th century
Minarets in Iran
Buildings and structures in Isfahan